The United States District Court for the District of Vermont (in case citations, D. Vt.)  is the federal district court whose jurisdiction is the federal district of Vermont.  The court has locations in Brattleboro, Burlington, and Rutland. The Court was created under the Judiciary Act of 1791 under the jurisdiction of the Eastern Circuit Court. Under the Midnight Judges Act, the Circuits were reorganised and this Court was assigned to the United States Court of Appeals for the Second Circuit where it has remained since. Originally created with one Judgeship, in 1966 a second Judgeship was added.

Appeals from the District of Vermont are taken to the United States Court of Appeals for the Second Circuit (except for patent claims and claims against the U.S. government under the Tucker Act, which are appealed to the Federal Circuit).

The United States Attorney's Office for the District of Vermont represents the United States in civil and criminal litigation in the court.  the United States Attorney is Nikolas P. Kerest.

Current judges
:

Former judges

Chief judges

Succession of seats

U.S. Attorneys
U.S. Attorneys for Vermont since it attained statehood in 1791 include:

U.S. Marshals

Duties and responsibilities
The United States Marshal for the District of Vermont oversees all Marshals Service operations in Vermont. The Vermont district maintains offices in Burlington and Rutland, enabling the Marshals Service to carry out its role with respect to public safety in Vermont. The U.S. Marshal for Vermont is responsible for federal law enforcement activities within the state, including apprehending fugitives and sex offenders, managing transport of federal prisoners, and protecting federal courthouses.

History
The offices of U.S. Marshal and Deputy Marshal were created by the 1st U.S. Congress when it passed the Judiciary Act of 1789. Marshals were presidential appointees and their duties included supporting the federal courts within their districts and executing the orders of the president, Congress and federal judges. Support of the courts included serving subpoenas, summonses, writs, and warrants, making arrests, and handling prisoners. Marshals were also responsible for the finances and administration of the courts, including paying fees, expenses, and salaries for court clerks, U.S. Attorneys, jurors, and witnesses. Marshals serve at the pleasure of the president, and when the positions were created, Congress created a time limit on Marshals' service. Marshals are limited to four-year, renewable terms that expire unless they are reappointed.

In the country's early years, Marshals rented courtroom and jail space, and hired and supervised bailiffs, criers, and janitors. They also handled the day-to-day activities of court proceedings, including ensuring that defendants were present, jurors were available, and witnesses appeared as required. Marshals were also called upon to carry out federal death sentences and investigate counterfeiting. Because they were paid on a fee system, the positions were lucrative and highly sought after.

Marshals also filled a gap in the federal government as it was originally designed, executing numerous tasks because no other agency was available to do them. These duties included taking the national census every 10 years until 1870, distributing Presidential proclamations, collecting statistical data for use by federal agencies, and supplying data on federal employees for including in a national register, deporting foreigners who entered the country illegally, and capturing fugitive slaves.

Over time, the duties of Marshals grew to include activities such as enforcement of the Eighteenth Amendment, the prohibition of the sale and transport of alcoholic beverages. In the modern era, the duties and responsibilities of U.S. Marshals include witness protection and apprehension of federal fugitives.

U.S. Marshals and dates of appointment
Vermont's U.S. Marshals have included:

Lewis R. Morris, March 4, 1791
Jabez G. Fitch, June 9, 1794
John Willard, March 11, 1801
David Robinson, January 7, 1811
Heman Allen, December 14, 1818
Joseph Edson, March 3, 1823
Heman Lowry, June 6, 1829
George W. Barker, December 30, 1835
Heman Lowry, March 7, 1837
William Barron, March 10, 1841
Jacob Kent Jr., March 15, 1845
John Pettes, March 13, 1849
Charles Chapin, April 1, 1853
Lewis S. Partridge, May 2, 1857
Charles C. P. Baldwin, April 12, 1861
Hugh H. Henry, July 25, 1865
George P. Foster, January 24, 1870
William W. Henry, April 10, 1879
John Robinson, June 24, 1886
Rollin Amsden, June 18, 1890
Emory S. Harris, June 9, 1894
Fred A. Field, June 14, 1898
Frank H. Chapman, October 16, 1903
Horace W. Bailey, October 21, 1903
Arthur P. Carpenter, February 14, 1914
Albert W. Harvey, June 2, 1922
Edward L. Burke, June 7, 1935
Dewey H. Perry, March 14, 1954
Thomas W. Sorrell, August 3, 1961
Christian Hansen Jr., June 20, 1969
Earle B. McLaughlin, July 28, 1977
Christian Hansen Jr., March 17, 1982
John Edward Rouille, September 29, 1994
John H. Sinclair, November 29, 1999
John R. Edwards, March 18, 2002
David E.  Demag, August 18, 2009
Bradley J. LaRose, January 2, 2019

See also
 Courts of Vermont
 List of current United States district judges
 List of United States federal courthouses in Vermont

References

External links
 
 United States Attorney for the District of Vermont Official Website

Vermont
Brattleboro, Vermont
Burlington, Vermont
Rutland, Vermont
1791 establishments in Vermont
Courthouses in Vermont
Courts and tribunals established in 1791